Oleksandr Suchu (born 22 January 1990 in Sevastopol, Ukrainian SSR, Soviet Union, now Ukraine), is a Ukrainian footballer, who is currently playing for Moldovan club Iskra-Stal.

Honors
 Iskra-Stal
 Moldovan Cup: 2010–11

References 

1990 births
Living people
Ukrainian footballers
FC Sevastopol players
Association football forwards
Sportspeople from Sevastopol